St Lucia Game Reserve, is part of the St Lucia Estuary and with that the focal point of the iSimangaliso Wetland Park, in the KwaZulu-Natal, province of South Africa. The Game Reserve was established in 1895.

See also 
 Protected areas of South Africa

External links
 See the St Lucia Game Reserve from the water, also driving directions to St Lucia.

References 
 http://www.kznwildlife.com/site/ecotourism/accommodation/allaccommodation/StLucia/

Ezemvelo KZN Wildlife Parks
Protected areas of South Africa

 http://stlucia.org.za/?cat=3